Aurora is an opera in three acts by the Argentine composer Héctor Panizza (also known as Ettore Panizza) set to an Italian libretto by Luigi Illica and Hector Quesada. Composed in 1907, Aurora became the second national opera of Argentina, after Felipe Boero's more popular El Matrero. Although its plot is set in Argentina, Aurora is Italian in style. Panizza's score shows a strong influence of Giordano and Mascagni.

Aurora was the first Argentine opera to be commissioned for the inaugural season of the Teatro Colón in Buenos Aires, where it premiered on 5 September 1908. The main tenor aria, "Alta en el cielo" ("High in the sky"), from the intermedio épico at the finale of Act 2 was used as a national hymn to the Argentine flag. What not many people know is that the Spanish lyrics are a poor translation of the original Italian text, so many lines are obscure and hard to make sense of.

The later revised version of the opera set in Spanish was premiered on 9 July 1945 and is now considered the Argentine patriotic opera par excellence. 
Aurora was also performed at Teatro Colón in 1909 (with Hariclea Darclée), 1945, 1953, 1955, 1965, 1966, 1983 and 1999.

Sources
Laurance, Rita, Aurora, opera, All Music Guide

External links 
 Original 1912 recording with tenor Amedeo Bassi

Operas
Italian-language operas
Spanish-language operas
1908 operas
Operas by Héctor Panizza
Operas set in South America